The 2022 Little League World Series was a youth baseball tournament which took place from August 17 to August 28 at the Little League headquarters complex in South Williamsport, Pennsylvania. Ten teams from the United States and ten teams from other countries competed in the 75th edition of the Little League World Series (LLWS). Honolulu Little League of Honolulu, Hawaii, defeated Pabao Little League of Willemstad, Curaçao, in the championship game by a 13–3 score; the game ended in four innings due to the run rule.

This was the first LLWS with a 20-team format. International teams returned to the tournament after the  edition was held only with teams based in the United States, as a result of the COVID-19 pandemic. The general public was able to attend tournament games with no attendance restrictions for the first time since the  edition.

Teams

Regional qualifying tournaments were held from February to August 2022. This is the first year for the Metro Region and the Mountain Region in the United States. This is also the first year of an annual rotational schedule involving the Caribbean and Latin America Regions whereby two of the three champions from Cuba, Panama, and Puerto Rico qualify directly while the third may still qualify through their normal regional tournament. In 2022, champions from Panama and Puerto Rico directly qualified.

Results

The draw to determine the opening round pairings took place on June 13, 2022.

United States bracket

International bracket

Third place game
This consolation game is played between the runner-up of the United States championship and the runner-up of the International championship.

World Championship

Champions path
The Honolulu LL reached the LLWS with an undefeated record in seven games. In total, their record was 13–0.

MLB Little League Classic
On August 22, 2021, it was announced that the fifth MLB Little League Classic would feature the Baltimore Orioles and the Boston Red Sox. The matchup was rescheduled from the  MLB season when events were canceled due to the COVID-19 pandemic. The game was played on August 21, 2022, at Muncy Bank Ballpark at Historic Bowman Field, and won by the Orioles, 5–3.

References

2022
2022 Little League World Series
2022 in sports in Pennsylvania
August 2022 sports events in the United States
2022 in baseball